Larisa Chzhao (born 4 February 1971) is a Russian middle-distance runner who specializes in the 800 metres.

In 2005, she won the European Indoor Championships, finished sixth at the World Championships and fifth at the World Athletics Final. She also achieved a personal best time with 1:57.33 minutes from Tula in July.

References

External links

1971 births
Living people
Russian female middle-distance runners